Salem taluk is a taluk of Salem district of the Indian state of Tamil Nadu. The headquarters of the taluk is the town of Salem.

Demographics
According to the 2011 census, the taluk of Salem had a population of 1,274,432, with 645,797 males and 628,635 females. There were 973 women for every 1000 men. The taluk had a literacy rate of 72.67%. Children under 6 totalled 59,730 males and 56,437 females.

References 

Taluks of Salem district